Jacek Robert Sasin (born 6 November 1969 in Warsaw) is a Polish politician and former local government official. In 2007 he assumed the role of voivode of the Masovian Voivodeship. His career included stints as the deputy head of the Chancellery of the President and as secretary of state in the Chancellery of the Prime Minister. Sasin is the serving deputy prime minister (from June 2019) and the minister for state assets (from November 2019). In the Sejm, he was the chairman of the Public Finance Committee. Sasin has a degree in history from Warsaw University, completing a thesis under Andrzej Garlicki, and later studied at Kozminski University.

2020 Polish election 

On May 10th, 2020, Sasin allocated PLN 68,896,820 for the Polish presidential election, which did not take place. The minister gave orders to print the ballot papers without any procedure or any legal basis, and to ultimately lost them. Koalicja Obywatelska filed a motion to dismiss Sasin but this did not come to fruition.

References

Law and Justice politicians
21st-century Polish politicians
University of Warsaw alumni
Living people
1969 births
Politicians from Warsaw